Steven J. Davis is an earth system scientist at the University of California, Irvine's Department of Earth System Science and holds a joint appointment in the Department of Civil and Environmental Engineering He is a highly cited researcher.

Education and legal career 
Davis received his undergraduate education at the University of Florida in Gainesville, Florida, his Juris Doctor at the University of Virginia School of Law, and his doctorate from Stanford University. From 2001-2004, Davis worked as a corporate lawyer at Gray, Cary, Ware & Freidenrich, LLC in Palo Alto, California advising venture-backed start-ups in Silicon Valley (now part of DLA Piper). He received his PhD in Geological and Environmental Sciences in 2008 from Stanford University. He then worked as a post-doctoral researcher with Ken Caldeira at the Carnegie Institution for Science's Department of Global Ecology from 2008 to 2012.

Research 
Davis researches embedded emissions of carbon dioxide and air pollution in international trade, energy systems, carbon lock-in, the quantities and causes of greenhouse gas emissions, and the interactions of agriculture and the global carbon cycle.

Awards
In 2015, Davis and his co-authors were awarded the Cozzarelli Prize by the Proceedings of the National Academy of Sciences for a paper they published on the role of China's international trade and air pollution in the United States. In 2018, Davis received the James B. Macelwane Medal of the American Geophysical Union (AGU) for his contributions in developing a science that links global climate change and society, and was simultaneously elected AGU Fellow.

Selected publications
 Davis, Steven J. et al (2018). "Net-zero emissions energy systems", Science, 360. 1419.
 Feng, Kuishuang, Davis, Steven J., Sun, Laixiang and Hubacek, Klaus. (2015). "Drivers of the U.S. CO2 emissions 1997-2013", Nature Communications, 6. 7714.
 Shearer, Christine, Bistline, John, Inman, Mason, and Davis, Steven J. (2014). "The effect of natural gas supply on U.S. renewable energy and CO2 emissions", Environmental Research Letters, 9. 094008.
 Lin, Jintai, Pan, Da, Davis, Steven J. et al.. (2014). "China's international trade and air pollution in the United States", Proceedings of the National Academy of Sciences, 111 (5). 1736-1741.
 Davis, Steven J. and Socolow, Robert. (2014). "Commitment accounting of CO2 emissions", Environmental Research Letters, 9. 084018.
 Davis, Steven J., Peters, Glen P. and Caldeira, Ken. (2011). "The supply chain of CO2 emissions", Proceedings of the National Academy of Sciences, 108 (45). 18554-18559.
 Davis, Steven J., Matthews, D. and Caldeira, Ken. (2010). "Future CO2 emissions and climate change from existing energy infrastructure", Science, 329. 1330-1335.
 Burney, Jennifer, Davis, Steven J. and Lobell, David. (2010). "Greenhouse gas mitigation by agricultural intensification", Proceedings of the National Academy of Sciences, 107 (26). 12052-12057.
 Davis, Steven J. and Caldeira, Ken. (2010). "Consumption-based accounting of CO2 emissions", Proceedings of the National Academy of Sciences, 107 (12). 5687-5693.

Other Affiliations
Davis co-founded two organizations related to climate change, the Climate Conservancy, a group working to assess and label consumer goods with their carbon footprints, and Near Zero, a non-profit that "...provides credible, impartial, and actionable assessment with the goal of cutting greenhouse gas emissions to near zero".

Davis is on the editorial board of Environmental Research Letters.

References

Living people
Stanford University alumni
American earth scientists
Environmental economists
People associated with renewable energy
Year of birth missing (living people)
21st-century American lawyers
California lawyers
Intergovernmental Panel on Climate Change contributing authors
Fellows of the American Geophysical Union
Climate change mitigation researchers